"Peppermint Pig" is a song by Scottish alternative rock band Cocteau Twins. It was released as both a single and 12" EP on 4 April 1983 by record label 4AD. Musically, the material was similar to their previous release, the 1982 EP Lullabies. It was the last release to feature original bassist Will Heggie.

Background 

Peppermint Pig marked the only time that Cocteau Twins used an outside producer for one of their recordings, with production handled by Alan Rankine of Associates. The group were dissatisfied with the results. Robin Guthrie described the EP as "shit" in a 1983 interview with Sounds, claiming it was "a bad mixture—bad song, bad producer, bad band." Elizabeth Fraser simply described the material as "all we had at the time".

Release 

"Peppermint Pig" was originally released as a limited-edition 7-inch single, featuring two tracks, "Peppermint Pig" and "Laugh Lines". A 12-inch EP was also released, including an extended mix of "Peppermint Pig", "Laugh Lines" and a third track, "Hazel".

An alternate version of "Hazel" was recorded for a Peel session. It appeared on the band's BBC Sessions album as well as on some CD reissues of Garlands.

The Peppermint Pig EP was re-released in CD format in 1991 as part of The Box Set. It contained both mixes of the title track in addition to the other two tracks. It was also part of the 2005 Lullabies to Violaine compilation release.

Track listing

Single

EP

CD

Personnel 
 Cocteau Twins

 Elizabeth Fraser – vocals
 Robin Guthrie – guitar, drum machine
 Will Heggie – bass guitar

 Production

 Alan Rankine – production
 John Fryer – engineering

References

External links 

  (single)
  (EP)

Cocteau Twins albums
1983 EPs